Isola del Cantone is a comune (municipality) in the Metropolitan City of Genoa in the Italian region Liguria, located about  north of Genoa.

Isola del Cantone borders the following municipalities: Arquata Scrivia, Busalla, Gavi, Grondona, Mongiardino Ligure, Roccaforte Ligure, Ronco Scrivia, Vobbia, Voltaggio.

References

Cities and towns in Liguria